Kevin Richard Long (born December 30, 1966) is an American former minor league baseball player and the current hitting coach for the Philadelphia Phillies of Major League Baseball (MLB). He has formerly served as the hitting coach for the New York Yankees (2007–14), New York Mets (2015–17) and Washington Nationals (2018–21).

Playing career
Long graduated from Thunderbird High School in Phoenix, Arizona.

Long was a second-team All-American in 1989 at the University of Arizona and was also named first-team Pac-10 that year. A three-year letter-winner, Long still holds the Arizona record for most extra-base hits in a game (five) and ranks in the top-10 in several different statistical categories (second, extra-base hits; sixth, doubles; seventh, multi-hit games; eighth, total bases; ninth, runs scored).

Long was selected by the Kansas City Royals in the 31st round of the 1989 Major League Baseball Draft.  He played in the Royals system for eight seasons, from 1989 until 1996. Long led Class-A Eugene in 1989 in games played, at bats, runs scored, hits, doubles, and RBIs. He also ranked eighth among all Northwest League hitters with his .312 batting average in his rookie season. He missed most of the 1994 season after undergoing surgery on his left wrist.

Coaching career
At the end of spring training in 1997, Long, who was assigned to the Triple-A Omaha Royals, decided to retire, asking instead for a coaching job. Long made his professional managing debut with the Class-A Wilmington Blue Rocks in 1997.  He was named the Northwest League's co-Manager of the Year after leading the Spokane Indians to the league title in 1999.

Long served as the hitting coach in the Royals organization with the Double-A Wichita Wranglers (2000–01) and Triple-A Omaha Royals (2002–03).  He became the hitting coach for the Yankees' Triple-A team, the Columbus Clippers, from 2004 to 2006.

Long was promoted to hitting coach for the New York Yankees in 2007.  Long guided a Yankees offense that ranked first in MLB in runs (968), hits (1,656), home runs (201), RBIs (929), team batting average (.290), slugging percentage (.463), on-base percentage (.366) and total bases (2,649). The 968 runs were the most in franchise history since 1937 (979). His offense also featured the American League MVP Alex Rodriguez, three Silver Sluggers (Derek Jeter, Jorge Posada and Rodriguez) and four of the American League's top-15 batting averages.

After a down year offensively in 2008, Long's Yankee hitters again led the league in offense during the 2009 season, in which they also won the franchise's 27th World Series title, and led the American League in runs again.

Following the 2010 season, the Yankees signed Long to a three-year contract. He was fired following the 2014 season.

On October 23, 2014, Long was hired by the New York Mets to be their hitting coach. 

After being turned down by the Mets for their open managerial position, Long left the team and became the hitting coach of the Washington Nationals on November 2, 2017. The team then won the World Series in 2019. That year the Nationals led the National League in on-base percentage and were in the top 10 in MLB in most other batting categories. Anthony Rendon was named an All-Star and Silver Slugger at third base and outfielder Juan Soto became a household name. 

In October 2021, Long left the Nationals to become the hitting coach of the Philadelphia Phillies, reuniting him with former Yankees manager Joe Girardi.

Personal life
When Long was still a player (though he does not remember which year), he suffered an accident during an offseason job with a drywall company, when a 25-pound sledgehammer hit him in the left eye, shattering three bones.

Long resides in Scottsdale, Arizona with wife, Marcey, daughter, Britney, and sons Tracy and Jaron. Jaron played professional baseball in the Yankees and Nationals organizations.

During the offseason, Long works part-time for organizations such as MVP Sports Camps.

References

External links

1966 births
Living people
Arizona Wildcats baseball players
Baseball City Royals players
Baseball coaches from Arizona
Baseball outfielders
Baseball players from Phoenix, Arizona
Baseball players from Scottsdale, Arizona
Eugene Emeralds players
Major League Baseball hitting coaches
Memphis Chicks players
New York Mets coaches
New York Yankees coaches
Omaha Royals players
Spokane Indians managers
Washington Nationals coaches
Wichita Wranglers players